Coastal Highway may refer to:

 The North West Coastal Highway of Australia
 The Makran Coastal Highway in Pakistan
 Parts of U.S. Route 17 in Georgia and South Carolina
 Parts of U.S. Route 98 in the Florida Panhandle
 Georgia State Route 25 in Port Wentworth, Georgia, United States
 Maryland Route 528 in Ocean City, Maryland, United States
 Delaware Route 1 between the Maryland border in Fenwick Island and Milford
 Highway 2 (Israel), the Coastal Highway along the Mediterranean Sea in Israel